Brendan George McCormack (born 11 August 1962) is a nursing academic and internationally renowned nursing leader. McCormack's research focuses on person-centredness with a particular focus on the development of person-centred cultures, practices and processes. McCormack is the Head of The Susan Wakil School of Nursing and Midwifery & Dean, Faculty of Medicine and Health, The University of Sydney. Additionally, McCormack maintains honorary academic positions at Edinburgh’s Queen Margaret University, Zealand University Hospital/University of Southern Denmark, Ulster University and University of Pretoria and is the Associate Director of the International Community of Practice for person-centred practice research (PcPR-ICoP). McCormack was the founding editor of “International Journal of Older People Nursing” and currently remains ‘Editor Emeritus’ of the journal.

Education
McCormack is a Registered Nurse, holds a BSc in nursing from Buckinghamshire New University, a Post Graduate Certificate in the Education of Adults from the University of Surrey and a DPhil in Educational Studies from the University of Oxford.

Early nursing career 
McCormack started out his career as a psychiatric staff nurse in St Loman's Hospital, Mullingar Ireland. Following becoming a Registered General Nurse, McCormack moved to the Royal Berkshire Hospital, Reading, England where he worked as a staff nurse in Trauma Orthopaedics and General Medicine, before moving to Battle Hospital, Reading, England and working as a staff nurse in Urology. Shortly after, McCormack returned to the Royal Berkshire Hospital to take upon his first Charge Nurse (Job-share)/Nurse Teacher role within the General & Vascular surgery unit.

Professional academic life
Professor McCormack became the Head of The Susan Wakil School of Nursing and Midwifery & Dean, Faculty of Medicine and Health, The University of Sydney in May 2022. Prior to this, McCormack was the Professor of Nursing and Head of the Divisions of Nursing, Paramedic Science, Occupational Therapy and Arts Therapies, School of Health Sciences, Queen Margaret University, Edinburgh (2014-2022). Additionally, McCormack is Extraordinary Professor, Department of Nursing, University of Pretoria, South Africa; Professor of Nursing, Maribor University, Slovenia; Visiting Professor, Ulster University; Adjunct Professor, Zealand University Hospital/University of Southern Denmark; Professor II, Østfold University College, Norway; Honorary Professor of Nursing, Queen Margaret University, Edinburgh.

Nursing research 
McCormack’s research focuses on person-centredness with a particular focus on the development of person-centred cultures, practices and processes. McCormack has specific expertise in gerontology and dementia practices. However, McCormack's work extends through all specialities and is multi-professional. McCormack is methodologically diverse, but has a particular fondness for participatory/action research. Additionally, McCormack brings expertise and enthusiasm to the use of arts and creativity in healthcare research and development.

Awards and recognition
2022: Member Academia Europaea

2019: Fellow of the American Academy of Nursing

2018: Listed in ‘We Nurses’ Twitter Group #100 outstanding nurses https://twitter.com/search?q=%23100outstandingnurses&src=tyah

2018: Honorary Fellow, Queens Nursing Institute Scotland

2017: Fellow of The RSA (Royal Society for the encouragement of Arts, Manufactures and Commerce)

2017: European Society for Person-centred healthcare 2017 Book Award Person-centred Healthcare Research – ‘the person in question’: The Person-centred Research Handbook, (2017) Wiley Publishers, Oxford (with for Eide T, Skovdal K, Eide H, Kapstad H and van Dulman S)

2016: Fellow Emeritus, Royal College of Surgeons in Ireland

2015: Distinguished Fellowship – European Society for Person Centered Healthcare (ESPCH)

2015:  Inspirational Nursing Leadership Award, Nursing Times

2014: International Researcher Hall of Fame, Sigma Theta Tau International

2014: Fellow of the Royal College of Nursing

2014: Ranked in the world’s top 3,000 researchers by the Thompson Reuters.

2008: Fellow of The European Academy of Nursing Science [EANS]

2011: Senior Distinguished Research Fellow, Ulster University

2011 (with Professor Bridie Kent):  Sigma Theta Tau Book of the Year (Kent B and McCormack B (2010) An enabling context for evidence-based practice.  Blackwell Publishing and Sigma Theta Tau International, Oxford).

Personal life
Married to Michael Davidson, two children.

Publications
McCormack has over 520 publications on Google Scholar which have been cited over 25,500 times giving him an h-index of 65. His top five highest cited articles are:

McCormack, B. and McCance, T.V. (2006), Development of a framework for person-centred nursing. Journal of Advanced Nursing, 56: 472-479. https://doi.org/10.1111/j.1365-2648.2006.04042.x

 
McCormack, B., Kitson, A., Harvey, G., Rycroft-Malone, J., Titchen, A. and Seers, K. (2002), Getting evidence into practice: the meaning of `context'. Journal of Advanced Nursing, 38: 94-104. https://doi.org/10.1046/j.1365-2648.2002.02150.x

Books

 Dewing, J., McCormack, B. and McCance, T. (2021) Person-centred Nursing Research:  Methodology, Methods and Outcomes, Springer Nature, Switzerland. https://doi.org/10.1007/978-3-030-27868-7 
 McCormack B, McCance T, Martin S, McMillan A, Bulley C (2021) Fundamentals of Person-centred Healthcare Practice Wiley, Oxford https://www.perlego.com/book/2068078/fundamentals-of-personcentred-healthcare-practice-pdf 
 Titchen, A. and McCormack, B. with Tyagi, V. (2020) Dancing the Mandalas of Critical Creativity in Nursing and Healthcare. Centre for Person-centred Practice Research, Queen Margaret University Edinburgh https://www.cpcpr.org/critical-creativity 
 McCormack B, Eide T, Skovdal K, Eide H, Kapstad H and van Dulman S (2017) Person-centred Healthcare Research – ‘the person in question’: The Person-centred Research Handbook, Wiley Publishers, Oxford.
 McCormack B and McCance T (2017) Person-centred Nursing and Health Care – Theory and Practice, Wiley Publishing, Oxford
 Dewing J, McCormack B and Titchen A (2014) Practice Development Workbook for Nursing, Health and Social Care Teams, Wiley-Blackwell Publishing, Oxford.
 McCormack B; Manley K and Titchen A (eds.) (2013) Practice Development in Nursing (Vol 2).  Wiley-Blackwell Publishing, Oxford.
 McCormack B and McCance T (2010) Person-centred Nursing: Theory, models and methods.  Blackwell Publishing, Oxford.
 Kent B and McCormack B (2010) An enabling context for evidence-based practice.  Blackwell Publishing and Sigma Theta Tau International, Oxford.
 Hardy S, Manley K, Titchen A and McCormack B (eds.) (2009) Revealing Nursing Expertise through Practitioner Enquiry.  Wiley-Blackwell Publishing, Oxford.
 Manley K, McCormack B and Wilson V (eds.) (2008) Practice Development in Nursing: International Perspectives.  Blackwell Publishing, Oxford.
 McCormack B; Manley K and Garbett R (eds.) (2004) Practice Development in Nursing.  Blackwell Publishing, Oxford.
 McCormack B (2001) Negotiating Partnerships with Older People - A Person-Centred Approach.  Ashgate, Basingstoke

References

External links

Professor Brendan McCormack T he Susan Wakil School of Nursing and Midwifery, Faculty of Medicine and Health, University of Sydney

The International Community of Practice for person-centred practice research (PcPR-ICoP)
I nternational Journal of Older People Nursing

Irish nurses
Living people
1962 births
Nursing researchers
Alumni of the University of Surrey
Alumni of the University of Oxford
Alumni of Buckinghamshire New University
Fellows of the Royal College of Nursing
Academics of Queen Margaret University
Fellows of the American Academy of Nursing